The Drina Banovina or Drina Banate, was a province (banovina) of the Kingdom of Yugoslavia between 1929 and 1941. Its capital was Sarajevo and it included portions of present-day Bosnia and Herzegovina and Serbia. It was named after the Drina River and, like all Yugoslav banovinas, was intentionally not based on ethnic boundaries. As a result of the creation of the Banovina of Croatia in 1939, its territory was reduced considerably.

Borders
According to the 1931 Constitution of the Kingdom of Yugoslavia,

Demographics 
According to the Yugoslav census of 1931, the Drina banovina had a population of 1,534,739 and a population density of 55.1 people per square kilometre.

The census also says that Drina banovina had a high agricultural population, with an agricultural population of 91.3 people per square kilometre. This was the second highest agricultural population density in the country behind only Vrbas Banovina (98.8). Overall, Drina banovina had 1,383,686 hectares of cultivated land.

History
In 1941, the World War II Axis Powers occupied the Drina Banovina and the province was abolished and divided between the Independent State of Croatia and German-occupied Serbia. Following World War II, the region was divided between Bosnia and Herzegovina and Serbia within a federal Socialist Yugoslavia.

See also

Podrinje
Bosnian Podrinje Canton
Šumadija and Western Serbia

References 

Yugoslav Serbia
Geographic history of Bosnia and Herzegovina
Banovinas of the Kingdom of Yugoslavia
1929 establishments in Yugoslavia
1941 disestablishments in Yugoslavia
Former subdivisions of Bosnia and Herzegovina